Lierstranda is a village in Lier municipality, Norway. Located immediately east of Drammen city along the Drammensfjord, it is a part of the urban area Drammen, which stretches into Lier. The part of the Drammen urban area that stretches into Lier has a population of 4,788.

References

Villages in Buskerud